Searsia koefoedi, or Koefoed's searsid, is a species of tubeshoulder found in the oceans at depths of from . It is named after Norwegian marine biologist Einar Koefoed.

Size
This species grows to a length of  SL.

Habitat and distribution
They live in deep-water environments. They are native to the areas of Eastern Atlantic, Denmark Strait, the Gulf of Guinea Northwest Atlantic in subtropical waters, Indian and Pacific oceans within tropical waters.

Etymology
The fish is named in honor of Norwegian marine biologist Einar Koefoed (1875–1963), who was responsible for the collected part of the type specimens in 1926 and who authored several papers on deep-sea fishes.

References

Platytroctidae
Fish of the Atlantic Ocean
Fish of the Indian Ocean
Fish of the Pacific Ocean
Fish described in 1937
Taxa named by Albert Eide Parr